Walter P.J. Droege (born 1952/1953) is a German billionaire businessman, who is the founder and board member of Droege International Group.

Walter Droege founded Droege International Group AG, which provides restructuring and turnaround advisory services, in 1988 in Düsseldorf, Germany. Droege was CEO of the company from its founding until 2018, when his eldest son, Ernest-W. Droege, succeeded him in the role.

According to Forbes, as of April 2019, Droege's net worth had been $6.4 billion. In 2020, this decreased to $2.5 billion.

Droege is married with at least one son, and lives in Düsseldorf, Germany.

References

Living people
German company founders
20th-century German businesspeople
21st-century German businesspeople
German billionaires
Year of birth missing (living people)
Businesspeople from Düsseldorf
1950s births